Mazatlán Futbol Club is a Mexican professional football team based in Mazatlán, Sinaloa currently playing in Liga MX. The club was established in June 2020 after the Monarcas Morelia franchise announced that it would be moving to the city of Mazatlán.

History

In 2017, the Government of Sinaloa decided to build a new football stadium in the city of Mazatlán as part of a project that intended to build and improve several sport venues in the state. One of the goals of this project was to have a professional football team playing in Mazatlán.

In 2020, works were accelerated in order to have the stadium completed before 30 June and ahead of the start of the 2020–21 season with the aim of looking for a professional team to move to the newly built stadium. The stadium was provisionally named as Estadio de Mazatlán (Mazatlán Stadium) and it reportedly cost 1.452 billion pesos. 

The Government of Sinaloa together with a group of businessmen from Mazatlán lobbied with a few Liga MX teams. Three franchises were rumored as potential candidates to move to Mazatlán for the 2020–21 season: Morelia, Puebla and Querétaro. 

On 2 June, it was officially announced that Monarcas Morelia was moving to Mazatlán and that it would be rebranded as Mazatlán Futbol Club. On 8 June, Mazatlán unveiled its crest and colours. The team colours are purple, black and white. 

On 11 June, the club presented Francisco Palencia as their manager for the 2020–21 season. On 27 July Mazatlán played their first official match, in which they were defeated against Puebla with a score of 1–4: the club's first official goal was scored by César Huerta.

Personnel

Management

Coaching staff

Players

First-team squad

Out on loan

Managers
  Francisco Palencia (11 June 2020 – 3 October 2020)
  Tomás Boy (5 October 2020 – 3 May 2021)
  Beñat San José (18 May 2021 – 2 March 2022)
  Gabriel Caballero (14 March 2022 – 29 January 2023)
  Ruben Omar Romano (4 February 2023 - Present)

References

External links
Mazatlán F.C. at ESPN

 
Liga MX teams
Association football clubs established in 2020
2020 establishments in Mexico
Football clubs in Sinaloa
Grupo Salinas